Mexico competed at the 2000 Summer Olympics in Sydney, Australia.

Medalists

Archery

In its sixth Olympic archery competition, Mexico entered two competitors.  Both lost in the first round.
Men

Athletics

Men
Track and road events

Field events

Women
Track and road events

Boxing

Canoeing

Sprint

Cycling

Mountain biking

Track

Diving

For the first time in 12 years, Mexico won a diving medal when Fernando Platas bested his eighth-place finish in Atlanta with a silver medal.

Men

Women

Equestrian

Dressage

Jumping

Gymnastics

Artistic

Individual finals

Judo

Modern pentathlon

Rowing

Men

Women

Sailing

Three men and one woman competed for Mexico in three events at the Sailing venue in the 2000 Sydney Olympics.

Men

Women

Shooting

Men

Swimming

Men

Women

Synchronized swimming

Taekwondo

Tennis

Men

Volleyball

Beach

Weightlifting

References

Wallechinsky, David (2004). The Complete Book of the Summer Olympics (Athens 2004 Edition). Toronto, Canada. .
International Olympic Committee (2001). The Results. Retrieved 12 November 2005.
Sydney Organising Committee for the Olympic Games (2001). Official Report of the XXVII Olympiad Volume 1: Preparing for the Games. Retrieved 20 November 2005.
Sydney Organising Committee for the Olympic Games (2001). Official Report of the XXVII Olympiad Volume 2: Celebrating the Games. Retrieved 20 November 2005.
Sydney Organising Committee for the Olympic Games (2001). The Results. Retrieved 20 November 2005.
International Olympic Committee Web Site

Nations at the 2000 Summer Olympics
2000
Olympics